Radio Hill (Finnish: Radiomäki) is a hill located in the city centre of Lahti, Finland.

The hill's earlier name was Selänmäki ('Ridge Hill'). After a cemetery was established there in the 1890s, the hill became known as Hautausmaanmäki ('Cemetery Hill').

The hill gets its present name from the Lahti longwave transmitter station established there in 1927–1928, and operated by the country's public broadcaster, Yle, until its decommissioning in 1993. The Finnish Radio and TV Museum, known as Mastola, is now located on the site, operated as part of the City of Lahti municipal museums.

The hilltop milieu surrounding the earlier radio station has been designated by the Finnish Heritage Agency as a nationally important built cultural environment (Valtakunnallisesti merkittävä rakennettu kulttuuriympäristö).

The city's oldest track and field venue (converted in winter to an open-air ice rink), opened in 1922, is also located on the hill by the foot of the radio masts.

References

Hills of Finland
Lahti
Geography of Päijät-Häme
Landforms of Päijät-Häme
Radio in Finland